The 3rd Edward Jancarz Memorial was the 1994 version of the Edward Jancarz Memorial. It took place on 15 May in the Stal Gorzów Stadium in Gorzów Wielkopolski, Poland. The Memorial was won by Joe Screen who beat Greg Hancock and Billy Hamill.

Heat details 
 15 May (Sunday)
 Best Time: 65.32 - Ryszard Franczyszyn in Heat 10
 Attendance: ?
 Referee: Roman Siwiak

Heat after heat 
 (66.22) Hamill, Hućko, Olszewsk, Huszcza
 (66.81) Hancock, Charczenko, Screen, Franczyszyn
 (66.84) Brhel, Świst, Kępa, Rickardsson (R)
 (67.81) Jankowski, Paluch, Wigg, Smith
 (66.15) Franczyszyn, Hamill, Jankowski, Kępa
 (65.63) Screen, Świst, Huszcza, Smith (F)
 (65.34) Hancock, Rickardsson, Paluch, Olszewski
 (65.56) Brhel, Charczenko, Wigg, Hućko
 (66.81) Screen, Rickardsson, Hamill, Wigg
 (65.32) Franczyszyn, Huszcza, Paluch, Brhel
 (67.53) Olszewski, Kępa, Charczenko, Smith (R4)
 (66.04) Hancock, Świst, Jankowski, Hućko (R4)
 (65.48) Hamill, Brhel, Hancock, Owiżyc, Smith (-)
 (65.72) Rickardsson, Jankowski, Charczenko, Huszcza (R4)
 (65.59) Franczyszyn, Olszewski, Wigg, Świst
 (67.37) Screen, Paluch, Kępa, Owiżyc (R4), Hućko (-)
 (66.97) Paluch, Hamill, Świst, Charczenko (R4)
 (67.04) Hancock, Wigg, Kępa, Huszcza
 (65.90) Screen, Brhel, Olszewski, Jankowski
 (65.72) Rickardsson, Franczyszyn, Owiżyc, Smith (-), Hućko (N)
 Third place Run-Off
 (65.53) Hamill, Franczyszyn
 First place Run-Off
 (67.53) Screen, Hancock

See also 
 motorcycle speedway
 1994 in sports

References

External links 
 (Polish) Stal Gorzów Wlkp. official webside

Memorial
Edward
1994